Spencer Brook is a stream in Isanti County, in the U.S. state of Minnesota.

Spencer Brook was named for Judge Benjamin Nicholson Spencer (1806-1881) from Pennsylvania, an early settler.

References

Rivers of Isanti County, Minnesota
Rivers of Minnesota